Aishwarya Narkar is an Indian actress who has appeared in Marathi films, serials and plays and has also appeared in numerous Hindi serials. She has also appeared in commercials.

Filmography

Stage

Television

Feature films

References

External links
 
 
 

1974 births
Living people
Indian film actresses
Actresses from Pune
21st-century Indian actresses
Indian television actresses
Marathi actors
Actresses in Marathi cinema
Actresses in Hindi cinema
Actresses in Marathi television